The 1907–08 Haverford Fords men's soccer team represented Haverford College during the 1907–08 ISFL season, and the 1907–08 ACCL season. It was the Fords seventh season of existence. The Fords entered the season as the three-time defending ISFA National Champions and successfully defended their title, sharing the national championship with Yale.

Schedule 

|-
!colspan=6 style="background:#c91631; color:#FFFFFF; border:2px solid #000000;"| ACCL season
|-

|-
!colspan=6 style="background:#c91631; color:#FFFFFF; border:2px solid #000000;"| ISFA season
|-

Statistics

Top goalscorers

References

External links 
1907–08 Season Stats

Haverford
1907
1907
Haverford Fords men's soccer
Haverford Fords men's soccer